Olympique Grande-Synthe Football (commonly referred to as OGS or simply Grande-Synthe) is a French football club based in Grande-Synthe in the Nord-Pas-de-Calais region. The club was founded in 1963 and is a part of a sports club that consists of several other sports.  The club plays in the Régional 1, the sixth tier of French football, after being relegated from 2019–20 Championnat National 3. The club is known for being the starting point for the careers of goalkeeper Rémy Vercoutre, centre back José-Karl Pierre-Fanfan, and midfielder Geoffrey Dernis.

References

External links
 

Association football clubs established in 1963
Grande-Synthe
1963 establishments in France
Sport in Nord (French department)
Football clubs in Hauts-de-France